Chase Tiatia (born 14 October 1995) is a rugby union player, who currently plays as a utility back for  in New Zealand's domestic National Provincial Championship competition. He has signed with the Western Force for the 2023 and 2024 Super Rugby season. He was born and raised in New Zealand, but is eligible to represent Manu Samoa internationally due to his Samoan heritage.

Early career

Born in Lower Hutt, Tiatia initially attended Hutt Valley High School before moving to St. Patrick's College  Silverstream for his final 3 years of schooling between 2010 and 2013.   While at St. Patrick's, he played first XV rugby and after graduation, he moved on to represent Wellington at under-19 level, helping them to win the first ever Jock Hobbs Memorial National Under-19 tournament in 2014. During his time in Wellington, he made a name for himself turning out for Hutt Old Boys-Marist in the Jubilee Cup Premier Division, Wellington's top club competition, where he finished as leading try scorer in 2014.

Senior career

Tiatia got his first chance at provincial level with the Wellington Lions in 2014. It proved to be a difficult environment for a 19-year-old to get his first taste of rugby in, as the Lions – generally one of the competitions strongest sides – were relegated from the Premiership down to the Championship. Initially held back by a broken thumb, he went on to make 3 appearances during the campaign and was named as Wellington's most promising player, before heading north to join the Bay of Plenty Steamers for the 2015 ITM Cup.

In Rotorua, Tiatia was reunited with former Wellington under-19s coach Clayton McMillan, now head coach of the Steamers. The move proved to be a fruitful one as he played in all 11 of Bay of Plenty's games in 2015 and netted 4 tries, which saw him win his province's rookie of the year and back of the year awards.

On 29 June 2022, the Hawke's Bay Rugby Union announced that Tiatia had signed with the  Magpies for the 2022 Bunnings NPC season. He made his debut for the province on 6 August 2022 against .

Super Rugby

Tiatia's excellent domestic form for the Bay of Plenty in 2015 brought him to the attention of New Zealand's Super Rugby franchises and he was subsequently named in the  squad for the 2016 Super Rugby season. As a young back in a star studded line up, Tiatia's first season at Super Rugby level was largely one of learning and he didn't get on the field at all in 2016, with his year being ended early with an elbow injury. Despite this, head coach Dave Rennie retained him in the squad for 2017.

International

Although born and raised in New Zealand, internationally Tiatia elected to represent the land of his ancestors, Samoa, at under 20 level. He was a member of their under-20 side which participated in the 2015 World Rugby Under 20 Championship where he scored 1 try in 5 appearances.

References

External links
itsrugby.co.uk profile

1995 births
Living people
People educated at Hutt Valley High School
People educated at St. Patrick's College, Silverstream
New Zealand sportspeople of Samoan descent
New Zealand rugby union players
Samoan rugby union players
Rugby union fly-halves
Rugby union wings
Rugby union fullbacks
Wellington rugby union players
Bay of Plenty rugby union players
Chiefs (rugby union) players
Hurricanes (rugby union) players
Hawke's Bay rugby union players
Western Force players